The Giligan's Football Club was an association football club based in the Philippines.

Honors
 Filipino Premier League
Runners-up (1): 2008

See also
 Giligan's Sisig Kings (PSL volleyball team)

References

Football clubs in the Philippines
Sports teams in Metro Manila